Appleby at Allington is a 1968 detective novel by the British writer Michael Innes. It is the twentieth in his long-running series featuring Sir John Appleby of Scotland Yard, now retired. It takes the form of a Golden Age country house mystery with elements of farce. It was released in the United States by Dodd, Mead under the alternative title Death by Water.

A review in the Times Literary Supplement described it as a "tasty, vintagey Innes, with the only disadvantage that he doesn't allow himself space to develop the many engaging characters and plot potentials".

Synopsis
While dining at Allington Park, the home of his neighbour Owain Allington who has recently reacquired his family's ancestral estates, Appleby and his host discover the body of Allington's nephew Martin in the control booth of the Son et lumière set up ahead of the garden fête being held the next day.

References

Bibliography
 Hubin, Allen J. Crime Fiction, 1749-1980: A Comprehensive Bibliography. Garland Publishing, 1984.
 Reilly, John M. Twentieth Century Crime & Mystery Writers. Springer, 2015.
 Scheper, George L. Michael Innes. Ungar, 1986.

1968 British novels
British mystery novels
British crime novels
Novels by Michael Innes
Novels set in England
British detective novels
Victor Gollancz Ltd books